Kungsgården is a locality situated in Sandviken Municipality, Gävleborg County, Sweden with 1,033 inhabitants in 2010.

Sports
The following sports clubs are located in Kungsgården:

 Kungsgårdens SK

References 

Populated places in Sandviken Municipality
Gästrikland